Clinomorphism is the deliberate or unintentional simplification, alteration, or amplification of the term for a medical condition (usually for dramatic effect). A caricature to which those (or care providers for those) with the condition may object is an example of simplification, while frequent overuse of a medical term, in the absence of bona fide symptoms, might be considered an amplification.

Issues

Clinomorphism is in fact often both a contributory factor in as well as being the result of the mythology and popular misconception of many medical conditions.

Clinomorphism is usually the basis for controversy in medical conditions such as posttraumatic stress disorder, myalgic encephalomyelitis (chronic fatigue syndrome), ADHD, and dyslexia where consensus is not easily established concerning the validity of the conditions and clinomorphism is in fact seen as pejorative, so that clinomorphic references to these conditions are ascribed respectively to being "cowardice", "malingering", "disobedience" and "stupidity".

Clinomorphism, whilst being a linguistic behaviour which exemplifies particular "errors" and deliberate misrepresentations, may also be a natural tendency in the sense that it is potentially an understandable consequence of the need to abbreviate or to simply use a clinomorphism as a metaphor to convey an otherwise difficult to describe idea, in much the same way as anthropomorphism might be (where one attributes the human characteristics or presence of a mind to anything nonhuman, purely for ease of description of a particular phenomenon, rather than as a result of holding a genuinely animistic or pantheistic belief).

An example of clinomorphic tendency would be in the case of autism or Asperger syndrome where particular characteristics of these syndromes (such as the limitations on the ability of a person to form a mental model of the state of mind of another person) would be clinomorphically used as a metaphor or simile for someone's behaviour, where the individual being described clinomorphically is not in fact believed by the utterer to be a person with the condition in question.

The danger is that this will be seen as an offensive misrepresentation of and disrespect towards the condition of an actual patient, and thus such clinomorphism (even as a metaphorical convenience) would need to be restricted to discreet private discourse, or avoided altogether.

Examples

Tourette syndrome
Tourette syndrome is typically clinomorphically depicted as being a condition of involuntary (and often unconscious) outbursts of offensive language or behaviour, usually on account of being unable to repress (or unaware that they are articulating) involuntary responses.

The typical clinomorphism of Tourette is both an oversimplification and a conflation of various aspects and conditions pertaining to some persons with Tourette syndrome. Some people with Tourette syndrome do have involuntary offensive speech which is termed coprolalia and is sometimes clinomorphised into the term "compulsive swearing" or "compulsive profanity", terms which have clinomorphic currency outside the use of the term "Tourette's". However, coprolalia is actually a relatively rare symptom of Tourette's. 

Today, the use of the term Tourette's is deemed incorrect. The correct usage is Tourette syndrome. This may seem like a minor or nitpicky distinction, but as with other disorders (such as Down syndrome), the possessive is discouraged.

Autism
Autism is clinomorphically seen as a condition where the autistic individual is essentially "mentally retarded" and/or a human calculator at the same time, a cultural perception exemplified by the movie Rain Man. In reality, although as many as 10% of individuals with autism spectrum disorders may display splinter skills such as memorization of trivia, autistic savant prodigies are extraordinarily rare; conversely, though autism is associated with intellectual disability, many individuals with autism spectrum disorders are not intellectually disabled. In fact, most individuals with autism spectrum disorders have an average IQ.

OCD
Obsessive-compulsive disorder and obsessive-compulsive personality disorder are two distinct psychological disorders, but media portrayals are often very simplistic and do not reflect the difference between the two. Though disorders can manifest themselves in a very wide range of symptoms, portrayals often tend towards caricature, and emphasize only the most stereotypical of symptoms.

In addition, the phrase "obsessive-compulsive" is often casually used to describe behavior which may be picky or pedantic, but is not at all close to the diagnostic criteria for obsessive-compulsive behavior. This trivializes the disorder, making OCD seem benign due to the misunderstanding of what the disorder actually entails.

Mood swings
Often individuals who are "moody" or have mood swings say they are bipolar. Bipolar disorder is an often severe mood disorder characterized by periods of days, weeks, or months of deep depression, alternating with periods of normal mood and/or manic episodes, which are not just periods of "high energy" or "productivity", though these may be a symptom of mania. Mania can also entail changes in thought patterns, psychosis, rapid speech, reduced need for sleep, and recklessness.

References

Medical terminology